The Seventh Regiment Championship was a tennis tournament first established in 1885 at Manhattan, New York City, United States and played on indoor hard courts at the Seventh Regiment Armory. It was part of the worldwide lawn tennis tennis circuit until 1950.

History
The Seventh Regiment Championship was a tennis tournament first established in 1885 at Manhattan, NYC, New York State, United States and played on indoor hard courts. It was part of the worldwide lawn tennis tennis circuit until 1950.

Finals

Men's Singles
(Incomplete roll)
 1885— Henry Graff Trevor def. ?
 1886— Valentine Gill Hall def. ?  
 1908— William Cragin Jr. def.  Calhoun C. Cragin, 6–4, 10–8, 3–6, 6–3 
 1920— Frank T. Anderson def.  Fred Anderson, 7–5, 6–1, 6–2 
 1921— Fred Anderson def.  Frank T. Anderson, 11–9, 6–8, 6–3, 6–4.  
 1928— Herbert Bowman def. Fred Anderson, 6–4, 6–2, 5–7, 6–3 
 1930— Herbert Bowman def.  Percy Rockafellow, 6–4, 8–6, 7–5  
 1943— Herbert Bowman def.  Edward E. Jenkins Jr., 3 to 0 sets

Women's Singles
(Incomplete roll)
 1929— Marie Wagner def.  Alice Francis, 6–3, 4–6, 8–6.

References

Defunct tennis tournaments in the United States
Wood court tennis tournaments
Indoor tennis tournaments